The Tuacahn Center for the Arts is an arts organization located at the mouth of the Padre Canyon, adjacent to Snow Canyon State Park, in Ivins, Utah. The  facility was completed in 1995 and includes a 1,920-seat outdoor amphitheater, a 328 seat indoor theater, a black box theater, a dance studio, a costume shop, a scene shop, and the campus of Tuacahn High School for the Arts. The Tuacahn Center for the Arts contributes to the arts by producing two or three performances on its amphitheater stage and offers a spring and fall concert series for the region.  They also produce the annual "Christmas in the Canyon" featuring a live-action recreation of the nativity called the "Festival of Lights."

History
Tuacahn was founded in 1995 by playwright Douglas C. Stewart. Partnering with philanthropist and businessman, Hyrum W. Smith, he planned to create a space to tell the stories of Utah's ancient inhabitants and pioneer settlers. The two, using a plot of  previously owned by Orval Hafen, set to build this dream. Seven Nielsen designed the amphitheater complex which included a 45,000-gallon water holding pond, a river spillway, and a drainage system for the flash-flood sequence in the inaugural run of the musical production of "Utah!"

Construction
During the construction of the center, two Mojave Desert Tortoises (an endangered species) were found dead along the road which led from the main highway to the construction site.  This halted construction while an investigation by the Fish and Wildlife Service commenced.  On August 18, 1994, an agreement was reached between the Heritage Arts Foundation and the US Fish and Wildlife Service in which the foundation paid a fine of $20,000 and agreed to special measures to ensure tortoises would be protected during construction and after the center opened.  This included special "tortoise-proof fences" and passages underneath the road where wildlife could pass under.

Opening and "Utah!: the Musical Spectacular"
Tuacahn opened in April 1995 with a dedication by Gordon B. Hinckley and the Mormon Tabernacle Choir.

The venue initially presented the musical Utah! (book by Robert Paxton, lyrics by Doug Stewart, music by Kurt Bestor and Sam Cardon, and production design by Seven Nielsen) a dramatic retelling of the founding of southern Utah through the eyes of Jacob Hamblin, an early pioneer called by Brigham Young to settle the city of Santa Clara and to make peace with the Native Americans in the region.  The production used the natural canyon setting to great effect, dramatically lighting the red rock cliffs and incorporating special elements like pyrotechnics, live animals, and special effects including a flash flood that came across the stage toward the audience.  Amidst the spectacle, the production's book included subjects sensitive to the Mormon population, including depictions of polygamy, the Mountain Meadows Massacre, and Jesus Christ's appearance to Native Americans, as recorded in the Book of Mormon.  Audience discomfort with these issues and lukewarm reviews prompted the rewriting of the show every season.  Minor changes were made between the premiere in 1995 and the 1996 production. A major rewrite was undertaken for the 1997 production by Reed McColm, but major characters remained and Jacob Hamblin was still central to the story.  In 1998, the book and lyrics were completely rewritten by Tim Slover and Marvin Payne, creating a fictional storyline that emphasized the peacemaking efforts between pioneers and native peoples.  The production was remounted one final time for an abbreviated fall season in 2002, with Stallion Cornell providing yet another new book based on the 1996 version of the show.  "Utah!" has not been produced since the 2002 season.

"Broadway in the Desert"
In 1999, with diminishing interest in "Utah!" and lackluster ticket sales from the 1998 season, the Tuacahn's board of directors changed the theater's programming to a season of more popular, family-friendly Broadway musicals presented in rotating repertory. The first season of this new format consisted of a double bill of Joseph and the Technicolor Dreamcoat and Seven Brides for Seven Brothers, both of which were wildly successful with visitors from all United States and 25 other nations. In 2002, productions of Annie Get Your Gun and Joseph and the Technicolor Dream Coat broke all previous box office records. This occurred again in 2003 when The Wizard of Oz broke all box office records at Tuacahn.

In 2005, under the direction of the new artistic director Scott Anderson, Tuacahn commemorated their tenth season by presenting Beauty and the Beast and a third production of Joseph and the Amazing Technicolor Dream Coat. These two shows once again beat all previous ticket sales. The successful production of "Disney's Beauty and the Beast" began a relationship between Tuacahn and Disney Theatricals that has lasted over a decade.  In 2006, MTI selected Tuacahn as one of eight regional theaters in the United States to present the first post-Broadway semi-professional productions of Les Misérables. In June 2009, Tuacahn was awarded rights to present the post-Broadway regional-theater premiere of Disney's Tarzan. Due to this success, Disney awarded them the rights for the post-Broadway regional premiere of The Little Mermaid. The 2014 season, which included The Little Mermaid, The Wizard of Oz, and Joseph and the Amazing Technicolor Dream Coat, was its most successful season to date hosting over 260,000 patrons.  Tuacahn announced its 2015 season would include "Disney's Beauty And The Beast," "Disney's When You Wish," and "Sister Act."  "Disney's When You Wish" was a world premier.

Educational Programs
Tuacahn's school facility was originally conceived as a private school where students would receive private lessons and participate in group classes.  The school was not initially successful, due in part to the remoteness of the location of the school.

In 1999, Tuacahn decided to re-open the school as a Utah Charter High School.  Tuacahn High School for the Performing Arts, a high school that combines a college preparatory curriculum and an arts focus in music, dance, theater, or visual art. Through the years it has been awarded with many accolades including first place at the Utah Shakespeare Festival. Over 30% of graduates from Tuacahn High continue onto college degrees.

Venues
Tuacahn has two venues most frequently used for theatrical productions.

Tuacahn Amphitheater 
The Tuacahn Amphitheater is a 1,920-seat open-air amphitheater.  It consists of three sections of seating (Left, Right, Center) with 32 rows A (front) - FF (rear).  All seats have backs and arms, but are not cushioned.  Entrance to the amphitheater is from the rear, requiring all patrons to descend the stairs toward their seats.  Patrons with limited mobility are encouraged to sit near the top (rear) of the amphitheater.  There is extra leg room on row O which is sometimes used during the productions when actors walk through the audience.  Wheelchair accessible seating is available on the back row (FF) only.  The stage has a concrete subfloor with a concrete pass-under tunnel to get from stage left to stage right out of view of the audience.  The rear of the stage is open to expose the desertscape and red rock cliffs behind the stage which contains lighting, sound, pyrotechnical, and water effects installations.  The area behind the stage is a mixture of natural stone and naturally colored concrete.  This concrete riverbed was installed during initial construction to facilitate a massive 55,000 gallon flood of water that comes from the back of the canyon and across the stage toward the audience.  Though conceptualized and custom-built for the "Utah!" production, this special effect and other water effects have been featured in numerous productions at Tuacahn.

The Hafen Theater 
The Hafen Theater is a 328-seat indoor proscenium arch theatrical facility.  It is part of the Tuacahn High School for the Performing Arts facility, though semi-professionally staged productions have been featured in this theater in the past.

Black Box and Dance Studio 
The black box theater and dance studio are used primarily as working spaces for school classes, rehearsals, and special events.  They are not commonly used for theatrical presentations.

Productions in the Amphitheater

1995
 Utah!

1996
 Utah!
 Quilters
 1940's Radio Hour

1997
 Utah!

1998
 Utah!
 How the West Was Won

1999
 Seven Brides for Seven Brothers
 Joseph and the Amazing Technicolor Dreamcoat

2000
 The Music Man
 Fiddler on the Roof

2001
 Oklahoma!
 The Sound of Music

2002
 Utah!
 Annie Get Your Gun
 Joseph and the Amazing Technicolor Dreamcoat
 Once on This Island (Tuacahn High School)

2003
 The Wizard of Oz
 The King and I
 The Unsinkable Molly Brown
 Bye Bye Birdie (Tuacahn High School)

2004
 Guys and Dolls
 West Side Story
 Singin' in the Rain
 Crazy for You (Tuacahn High School)

2005
 Beauty and the Beast
 Joseph and the Amazing Technicolor Dreamcoat
 Les Misérables: School Version (Tuacahn High School)

2006
 Peter Pan
 South Pacific
 Cats

2007
 Cinderella
 My Fair Lady
 42nd Street

2008
 Les Misérables
 The Sound of Music
 Big River

2009
 Annie
 Footloose
 Aida

2010
 Tarzan
 Cats
 Crazy for You

2011
 The Little Mermaid
 Grease

2012
 Aladdin
 Hairspray
 Titanic (Tuacahn High School)

2013
 Mary Poppins
 Starlight Express
 Thoroughly Modern Millie
 West Side Story (Tuacahn High School)

2014
 The Little Mermaid
 The Wizard of Oz
 Joseph and the Amazing Technicolor Dreamcoat
 South Pacific (Tuacahn High School)

2015
 Beauty and the Beast
 Disney's When You Wish (musical)
 Sister Act
 Footloose (Tuacahn High School)

2016
 Grease (Tuacahn High School)
 Peter Pan
 Disney's Tarzan
 The Hunchback of Notre Dame

2017
 Little Shop of Horrors (Tuacahn High School)
 Shrek The Musical
 Mamma Mia!
 Newsies

2018
 Rodgers & Hammerstein’s Cinderella
 Matilda the Musical
 The Prince of Egypt

2019
 The Sound of Music
 The Little Mermaid
 Disney's When You Wish (musical)

2021
  Annie
 Beauty and the Beast
 School of Rock
 The Count of Monte Cristo

2022
 Mary Poppins 
 Wonderland 
 Joseph and The Amazing Technicolor Dreamcoat 

2023 
 Disney's Tarzan 
 Ronald Dahl's Charlie and the Chocolate Factory 
 The Hunchback of Notre Dame

Productions in the Hafen Theatre

1995
 The Fantasticks
 Greater Tuna
 The Taffetas

1996
 Quilters
 The 1940's Radio Hour

2000
 See How They Run

2001
 Nunsense
 The Littlest Angel (Tuacahn High School)

2002
 The Diviners (Tuacahn High School)
  Anything Goes (Tuacahn High School)

2003
  I Never Saw Another Butterfly (Tuacahn High School)
 Schoolhouse Rock! (Tuacahn High School)

2004
 The Teahouse of the August Moon (Tuacahn High School)

2006
 Grease: School Version (Tuacahn High School)

2007
 Little Shop of Horrors

2008
 Disney's High School Musical

2009
 Disney's High School Musical 2

2012
 How to Succeed in Business Without Really Trying (Tuacahn High School)
 The 25th Annual Putnam County Spelling Bee

2013
 The Crucible (Tuacahn High School)
 Mulan

2014
 The Threepenny Opera (Tuacahn High School)
 The Tempest (Tuacahn High School)

2016
 These Shining Lives (Tuacahn High School)

2017
 Smokey Joe's Cafe (Tuacahn High School)
 Fairytale Christmas

2018
 Million Dollar Quartet
 Shakespeare In Love (Tuacahn High School)
 Fairytale Christmas

2019
 A Gentleman's Guide to Love and Murder
 Elf

See also

 List of contemporary amphitheaters

References

External links

 

Arts centers in Utah
Theatres in Utah
Amphitheaters in the United States
Buildings and structures completed in 1995
Theatres completed in 1995
Buildings and structures in Washington County, Utah
Tourist attractions in Washington County, Utah
Performing arts centers in Utah
1995 establishments in Utah